Sensitive Skin is a BBC television comedy-drama series, produced by Baby Cow Productions for BBC Two. It stars Joanna Lumley and was first broadcast in 2005, with a second series following in 2007. Series 1 and 2 have aired on CBC Country Canada. Series 1 aired in Australia on ABC TV in mid-2007 (repeated 2009).

On 5 August 2008, BBC Video announced a DVD release. Sensitive Skin – The Complete Seasons 1 and 2 – a 2-disc set including all 12
original episodes from the First and Second Seasons.

Plot summary

Series 1
The first series is about an affluent couple, Al and Davina Jackson (Lumley), who live in metropolitan London. Along with their friends, Al and Davina struggle with sexual temptation and professional jealousy and try to cope with their fear of the future. Al is a pundit for a broadsheet newspaper and is paid to find imperfection in everything, while Davina works in an art gallery and is paid to make life more beautiful. But being 60 isn't simple – the couple's 30-year-old son, Orlando (James Lance), refuses to acknowledge adulthood, and Davina's sister, Veronica (Maggie Steed), and her husband, Roger, intimidate the Jacksons with their confident and controlled grasp of life.

Series 2
The second series sees Davina attempt to start her life again, six months after the death of Al. She embarks on a journey to rediscover personal happiness, however her efforts are hampered by the difficulties she faces in coping with grief alone and Veronica, who is still blaming her for everything she can.

Episode titles

Unlike the first season, season 2 featured individual episode titles

Episode 1: The Wilderness
Episode 2: Three Lost Loves
Episode 3: The Signals
Episode 4: Forever Jung
Episode 5: Kiss of Life
Episode 6: Here I Am

Main Cast: Season 2
Joanna Lumley as Davina Jackson (Episodes 1 to 6)
Nicholas Jones as Roger Dorkins (Episodes 1, 3, 5 and 6)
Maggie Steed as Veronica Dorkins (Episodes 1, 3 and 5)
Jean Marsh as Lizzie Galbraith (Episodes 2, 3, 4 and 6)
Oliver Cotton as Sam (Episodes 1, 3, 4 and 6)

Recurring Cast
Patrick Barlow as Ed Hubler (Episodes 2 and 6)
Maureen Lipman as Sue Shortstop (Episodes 2 and 6)
Anthony Head as Tom (Episodes 3 and 6)
James Lance as Orlando Jackson (Episodes 4 and 6)
Diana Quick as Cheryl Jackson (Episodes 4 and 6)
Tom Allen as Raphie (Episodes 4 and 6)

Minor Cast
Simon Day as Mike (Episode 1)
Denise Black as Mike's wife (Episode 1)
Adam Rayner as Greg (Episode 1)
Lucinder Millward as Estate Agent (Episode 1)
Patrick Malahide as Leonard Richards (Episode 5)
Simon Williams (actor) as Matthew Clasper (Episode 5)
Deddie Davies as Deddie (Episode 2)
Blanche Williams as Blanche (Episode 2)
Sheila Collings as Sheila (Episode 2)
Dinah Nicholson as Woman 1 (Episode 2)
Marina Morgan as Woman 2 (Episode 2)
Keeley Dellar as Woman 3 (Episode 2)
Cate MacKenzie as Woman 4 (Episode 2)
Sophie Wu as Lucy (Episode 2)
Eileen Essell as Davina and Veronica's mother (Episode 3)
Nigel Terry as George Laughton Quentin Evelyn Henry Fitzgerald, a.k.a. Al (Episode 6)
Toby Longworth as Guest (Episode 6)

Reception
The series garnered great critical reception, praising the performances and the melancholic style, which set it apart from the standard cringe-driven comedies that had been in wide circulation since The Office. Public reception was also good, with people appreciating the return of Joanna Lumley and warming to the sparse comedic style.

"One of the best pieces of television in years... Sensitive Skin, a portrait of a disturbingly disconnected ageing beauty whose marriage gradually disintegrates, is part comedy, part poignant drama, and is one of the finest performances of Lumley’s 38-year career"    Jasper Gerard, Sunday Times

DVD release
Sensitive Skin – The Complete Seasons 1 and 2 was released on Region 1 DVD on 5 August 2008. The two-disc collection includes all 12 episodes from the first and second seasons.

Canadian adaptation

A Canadian adaptation, starring Kim Cattrall, Don McKellar, Elliott Gould, and Colm Feore, premiered in fall 2014 on Movie Central and The Movie Network. The 6-episode first season is written by Bob Martin and directed by Don McKellar.

References

External links
 
Sensitive Skin at the British Film Institute

2005 British television series debuts
2007 British television series endings
2000s British comedy-drama television series
BBC high definition shows
British comedy-drama television shows
Television shows set in London
BBC television comedy
English-language television shows